Goluboy Zaliv is a settlement (a  dachny posyolok) in Novosibirsky District of Novosibirsk Oblast, Russia. It is a part of Morskoy Selsoviet. Population: 238 (2010 Census). Goluboy Zaliv is located between Leninskoye and ObGES Microdistrict of Novosibirsk.

References

Rural localities in Novosibirsk Oblast
Novosibirsky District